Panspoudastiki Kinisi Synergasias (PSK, All Student Cooperation Movement) is the Communist Youth of Greece's (KNE) major branch in Greek universities.

The group was founded shortly after the restoration of democracy in 1974 and the fall of the regime of the colonels. The newly appointed Karamanlis cabinet legalized Communist Party of Greece (KKE), shortly after its inauguration in 1975. KKE became a legitimate party, after a period of political isolation that lasted from 1949 to 1975. Its legitimization was also a historical reconciliation between the two opposing factions of the Greek civil war. The group's formation was compatible with the party's program and political aims. These aims included the radicalisation of the 1970s strong political movement of the country's students. This movement played a vital role in the fight against the seven years junta. The zenith of the movement came in 1973 with the students' uprising in the polytechnic university and the Communist Youth was there to support the student's fight against dictatorship.

Panspoudastiki K.S., is the fighting students organization in all the Universities (AEI) and Technical Institutes (TEI) of Greece. It is supported by thousands of students and fights for the prosperity and the education of the vast majority of Greek students, especially those who descend from worker, farmer or not financially strong families. Students who wish to fight against the problems of their studies, their schools and all the problems that threaten the University Level Education. These problems-according to the members and friends of the Panspoudastiki K.S.-originate from the antipopular political strategy that is followed by the two major Parties of Greece, the Panhellenic Socialist Movement (PASOK) and the New Democracy (ND) party. PKSsarioi (as the followers of Panspoudastiki are usually called), accuse the leftish party of SYN/SYRIZA for the current bad situation of Education as well, because it follows the commands of the European Union which the Communists oppose to.

Panspoudastiki K.S., also fights for the daily problems that students face in their school like the university studies program, the working and practicing opportunities that are offered to Greek students. What PKSariou want to achieve, is "One-University Level-Popular-Free Education for everyone". It also supports athleticism, entertainment, environmental protection, democratic rights, the peace movement against imperialism and the fight against all kinds of drugs.

Even though Panspoudastiki K.S., believes in the ability of the students' movement to delay unpopular laws and actions, they are sure that a movement that does not include the majority of the people, cannot achieve any revolutionary goals. The students must unite with their natural allies, the working class and the lower classes of society that is daily oppressed by the capitalists and their governments. It is a core ideological element, that the problems of the students and the problems of the workers have common causes, the current political system which is capitalistic and imperialism. That is why, one of the most famous slogans used by this student organization is "Workers, Farmers, Students! Our Union is our response to the Multinational Companies"!

On 9 May, were held the Students' Unions  elections in Greece. The students list Panspoudastiki(PKS) in which the forces of KNE participate after these elections has increased in general level its power and with more forces  will make their best in order to continue the big struggles that have taken place since May 2006 against the reactive capitalist reconstructions in education that according to EU are being promoted by the government of right wing of "New Democracy" and social democrats of "PASOK". In cities in which put their stamp on the mobilizations, like Athens that gave the rhyme of these manifestations and represents the half of the whole country's votes -  PKS was increased 1% in the universities and 4,5 in the Technical Universities. The increase is being expressed with 8 universities students Unions and 5 technical Universities Unions that PKS is first power. In tens of Students Unions in the whole country  PKS is also second power. The controversy among the different forces is very big. The list of government of New Democracy, DAP had a deterioration of its forces, but the list of the social democrats of PASOK and its students' organization, PASP, didn't succeed to earn this loss of percentage of DAP. We have to underline that both these lists are preserving the high level of their electoral percentage. The various leftists groups are presenting an increase which occurs also in concrete cases due to the unification of different groups this year, but generally speaking their forces remain small.
In the 2014 election, PKS became the second most voted force in both the Universities and the technical institutions, being the only participating group that recorded an increase in absolute votes, despite the rise of the abstention in the elections.

See also
Communist Party of Greece
Communist Youth of Greece

Communist Party of Greece
Student wings of communist parties
Student political organizations in Greece
Communist organizations in Greece